"Tender Love" is a song by Force MDs from their second album Chillin (1985).  Written and produced by Jimmy Jam and Terry Lewis, the tune appeared in the film Krush Groove (1985), and was featured on the film's soundtrack.

Background
Although primarily known as a pre-new jack swing/old school hip hop band, the Force MDs introduced themselves to a whole new audience with this song. Not only did the song reach number 4 on the R&B charts (where the group had already amassed a steady string of minor hits), but it also became a crossover hit, cracking the top ten on the Billboard Hot 100 in the spring of 1986,  becoming the group's only single to date to break the Pop top 40. On the Adult Contemporary chart, the song peaked at number 2. The song was also a hit in the United Kingdom, reaching number 23 in the UK Singles Chart.

Chart positions

Notable covers
"Tender Love" has been covered by numerous artists. The most widely known version was by English singer Kenny Thomas which reached number 26 on the UK Singles Chart in 1991.

References

1985 songs
1985 singles
1980s ballads
Force MDs songs
Contemporary R&B ballads
Pop ballads
1991 singles
Kenny Thomas (singer) songs
Song recordings produced by Jimmy Jam and Terry Lewis
Songs written by Jimmy Jam and Terry Lewis
Tommy Boy Records singles
Warner Records singles
Cooltempo Records singles